The Seventeenth Century is a quarterly peer-reviewed academic journal covering research on the 17th century published by Taylor & Francis. It is abstracted and indexed in the Arts & Humanities Citation Index.

See also
 List of history journals

References

External links 
 
 Print: 
 Online: 

English-language journals
History journals
Publications established in 1986
Quarterly journals
Taylor & Francis academic journals